Cláudio Winck Neto (born 15 April 1994), known as Cláudio Winck, is a Brazilian professional footballer who plays as a right back for Marítimo. He is also a former Brazilian youth international.

Club career

Internacional
Winck was born in Portão, Rio Grande do Sul, and joined Internacional's youth setup in 2010 from rivals Grêmio. He made his first team debut on 22 January 2012, starting in a 2–3 Campeonato Gaúcho away loss against Avenida.

Winck only appeared in one further match for the side before returning to the under-20s, but was definitely promoted to the main squad in December 2012. A backup to Gabriel, he made his Série A debut on 11 August 2013 by coming on as a second half substitute in a 2–2 home draw against Clube Atlético Paranaense.

Winck started the 2014 season by scoring a double in a 2–2 Recopa Gaúcha draw against Pelotas, as his side lost the title on penalties. On 18 July 2014 he scored his goal in the top tier, but in a 1–2 loss at Corinthians.

Verona (loan)
On 21 July 2015, Winck completed a loan move to Italian Serie A side Hellas Verona. He made his debut for the club on 2 December, replacing Luca Checchin and scoring winner in a 1–0 victory over Pavia for the season's Coppa Italia.

Winck returned to Brazil in March 2016, with his loan spell being ended early by agreement between the two clubs. He failed to feature in any Serie A matches and in total made two cup appearances for Verona during his loan.

Chapecoense (loan)
On 18 March 2016, immediately after returning from Italy, Winck was loaned to Chapecoense until December. He made his debut for the club on 24 April, starting and scoring his team's first in a 2–3 Campeonato Catarinense away loss against Criciúma.

Winck did not board LaMia Airlines Flight 2933 for the 2016 Copa Sudamericana Finals, which crashed and killed 19 of his teammates.

Marítimo

On 14 September 2020, Winck signed a tree-year contract with Marítimo.

Career statistics

Honours

Club
Internacional
Campeonato Gaúcho: 2012, 2013, 2014, 2015

Chapecoense
Campeonato Catarinense: 2016

Country
Brazil U17
South American Under-17 Football Championship: 2011

References

External links

1994 births
Living people
Sportspeople from Rio Grande do Sul
Brazilian people of German descent
Brazilian footballers
Association football defenders
Campeonato Brasileiro Série A players
Primeira Liga players
Sport Club Internacional players
Associação Chapecoense de Futebol players
Hellas Verona F.C. players
Sport Club do Recife players
CR Vasco da Gama players
C.S. Marítimo players
Brazilian expatriate footballers
Brazilian expatriate sportspeople in Italy
Expatriate footballers in Italy
Expatriate footballers in Portugal
Brazil youth international footballers